T. V. Narendran (born 2 June 1965) is an Indian business executive. He is currently the global CEO and Managing Director of Tata Steel, one of the largest steel producers in the world. He is the current President of Confederation of Indian Industry.

Background
Narendran holds an undergraduate degree in mechanical engineering from Regional Engineering College, Tiruchirappalli (now known as National Institute of Technology, Tiruchirappalli) and an MBA from Indian Institute of Management Calcutta.

Career
Narendran joined Tata Steel in 1988 straight after his MBA from IIM Calcutta. He worked in the International Trading Division of Tata Steel from 1988 to 1997 wherein he spent five years in Dubai looking after Tata Steels' exports to the Middle East.  From 1997 to 2001, he spent time in Tata Steels' marketing and sales division and was involved in market development work for the Cold Rolling Mill Project, Supply Chain Management, Sales Planning, etc.  From 2001 to 2003, he was the Chief of Marketing & Sales (Long Products) and played a key role in building the 'Tata Tiscon' brand and the distribution network for the same.  From 2003 to 2005, he worked with B. Muthuraman, the then Managing Director of Tata Steel, as his Principal Executive Officer.

Before being appointed as MD - Tata Steel India and South East Asia, on 1 November 2013, Narendran was the Vice President - Safety & Flat Products Divisions of Tata Steel.

He is currently on the Boards of Tata Steel Limited, Tata Steel Europe, CEDEP, XLRI and World Steel Association.  

T. V. Narendran, CEO & Managing Director of Tata Steel Limited was the President of the Confederation of Indian Industry (CII) for the year 2021-22.  In May 2022, He was succeeded by Sanjiv Bajaj as the President of CII.

On 31 October 2017, he was appointed as the global CEO and MD of Tata Steel.

References

Indian Institute of Management Calcutta alumni
Indian chief executives
Living people
National Institute of Technology, Tiruchirappalli alumni
1965 births
Tata Steel people
Chevening Scholars